The National Front for the Family is a Mexican coalition of over 1000 organizations.

History
The National Front for the Family formed in 2016 after Peña Nieto pushed an initiative that would've legalized same-sex marriage. The initiative would've also allowed homosexuals to adopt children and established no-fault divorce. Peña Nieto's initiative was rejected by congress and his party lost 7 of 12 governorships later the same year.

Support

Brian S. Brown has said, "The National March for the Family has the potential of being the largest single demonstration of support for marriage, children and parental rights in history."

References

External links

Conservatism in Mexico
Political organizations based in Mexico